The Frontier Regions (often abbreviated as FR) of Pakistan were a group of small administrative units in the Federally Administered Tribal Areas (FATA), lying immediately to the east of the seven main tribal agencies and west of the settled districts of Khyber Pakhtunkhwa. Each of the Frontier Regions was named after an adjoining settled district and was administered by the district coordination officer (DCO) of that adjacent district. The overall administration of the Frontier Regions was carried out by the FATA Secretariat based in Peshawar, the capital of Khyber Pakhtunkhwa. The six Frontier Regions were:

See also
Federally Administered Tribal Areas
Bannu District
Dera Ismail Khan District
Kohat District
Lakki Marwat District
Peshawar District
Tank District

References

External links
Government of the Federally Administered Tribal Areas
Pakistani Federal Ministry of States and Frontier Regions

 
 
Former subdivisions of Pakistan
Frontier
States and territories disestablished in 2018
2010s disestablishments in Pakistan